Fintan Kilbride (18 March 1927 – 21 December 2006) was a Catholic priest and teacher committed to the poor.

Biography

Early life and missionary work
Fintan was born in Bray, County Wicklow, Ireland. He grew up in Clonmel, County Tipperary. He was the son of Bernard Joseph Kilbride and Anne Ledwith Kilbride and the brother of Brian, Nuala, Dympna, Aidan, Louise, Kevin, and Malachy. He is also the uncle of Malachy Kilbride the peace activist. He joined the Holy Ghost Fathers and served as a missionary in Nigeria, where he taught in high schools, helped build a hospital and three schools, and founded a teacher's college in Nigeria. He was expelled from Biafra in 1970.

Marriage and children
He married Kenise Murphy Kilbride in 1973. The couple had two children, Siobhan Kilbride and Ciara Kilbride Amaral (married to Nelson Amaral).  He became a grandfather in 2004 when the first of his three grandchildren: Declan Amaral was born.  Rhianne Amaral was born in 2006, and Ronan Amaral was born in 2010.

Career
After Nigeria, Kilbride settled in Toronto, Ontario, Canada. He taught English at Neil McNeil Catholic Secondary School from 1975 to 1992. He was active in social justice causes, co-founding the Ecumenical Good Friday Walk in 1979, and created Students Crossing Borders in 1991, a program that introduced youth to the realities of living and working in less developed countries, and to the responsibilities that privilege brings. He served on the board of directors of Free The Children.

Death and afterward
Peacefully with his wife Kenise Murphy Kilbride, Fintan died 21 December 2006.

Awards
2005: Marion Tyrrell Award of Merit, Ontario English Catholic Teachers' Association
2005: Lewis Perinbam Award, World University Service of Canada

References

External links
Fintan Kilbride obituary
Ecumenical Good Friday Walk
Students Crossing Borders

1927 births
2006 deaths
20th-century Canadian Roman Catholic priests
Canadian schoolteachers
People from Clonmel
Irish expatriates in Nigeria
Irish emigrants to Canada